"Top of the World" is a 1972 song written and composed by Richard Carpenter and John Bettis and first recorded by American pop duo Carpenters. It was a Billboard Hot 100 No. 1 hit for the duo for two consecutive weeks in 1973.

Carpenters originally intended the song to be only an album cut. However, after country singer Lynn Anderson covered the song and it became a number two hit on the country charts, they reconsidered.

The Carpenters version

Background
Originally recorded for and released on the duo's 1972 studio album A Song for You, the song topped the Billboard Hot 100 singles chart in late 1973, becoming the duo's second of three No. 1 singles, following "(They Long to Be) Close to You" and preceding "Please Mr. Postman." Karen Carpenter re-recorded it for the band's first compilation as she was not quite satisfied with the original.

In Japan, it was used as the opening theme song for the 1995 Japanese drama Miseinen. In 2003, another drama, Beginner, had it as its ending theme song. It is heard in Shrek Forever After as Shrek enjoys being a "real ogre" and terrifying the villagers, as well as in a prominent scene of the 2012 film Dark Shadows, where a performance by the Carpenters is seen on a television screen. It has been used as the opening song of the Season 2, Episode 1 of Netflix series After Life. In his Oscars acceptance speech for Best Original Song, "Naatu Naatu," composer M.M. Keeravani mentioned the Carpenters and briefly interpolated his thanks to the tune of "Top Of The World." 

Cash Box praised Karen Carpenter's "strong lead vocal" and the pair's vocal harmonies.

Personnel
Karen Carpenter – lead and backing vocals
Richard Carpenter – backing vocals, Wurlitzer electronic piano, orchestration
Joe Osborn – bass guitar
Hal Blaine – brushed drums
Tony Peluso – electric guitar
Buddy Emmons – pedal steel guitar
Uncredited – tambourine

Chart performance

Year-end charts

All-time charts

Certifications

Lynn Anderson version

Background
Country music singer Lynn Anderson covered the song in 1973 for her studio album Top of the World, released on Columbia Records. It was the first single released from her album and her version became the first hit. Anderson's cover reached No. 2 on the US country singles chart and No. 74 on the Billboard Hot 100 in mid-1973. The success of Anderson's version prompted the Carpenters to release a new version as a single, where it topped the US pop singles chart for two weeks in December 1973. Anderson's recording was produced by her husband Glenn Sutton and Clive Davis. She later re-recorded the song for her 2004 album, The Bluegrass Sessions.

Chart performance

Other versions
In early 1973, New Zealand male singer Steve Allen took his version to #1 in New Zealand for a week, sharing the top with The Carpenters version.
In 1974, the Swedish dansband Vikingarna had a Svensktoppen hit with a Swedish version by Benny Borg, "På världens tak (On the roof of the world)", which was the first Vikingarna song to chart on the Svensktoppen.
A version by Japanese alternative rock band Shonen Knife appeared on the 1994 Carpenters tribute album If I Were A Carpenter, and plays during the closing credits of the 1995 movie The Last Supper.

See also
List of Hot 100 number-one singles of 1973 (U.S.)

References

External links
 
 

1972 songs
1973 singles
The Carpenters songs
Lynn Anderson songs
Vikingarna (band) songs
Steve Allen (singer) songs
Anti-war songs
Billboard Hot 100 number-one singles
Cashbox number-one singles
Number-one singles in Australia
RPM Top Singles number-one singles
Songs with lyrics by John Bettis
Songs written by Richard Carpenter (musician)
Japanese television drama theme songs
Columbia Records singles
A&M Records singles
Mona Gustafsson songs
Song recordings produced by Glenn Sutton